Pinola is an unincorporated community in Scipio Township, LaPorte County, Indiana.

It was named for the growth of pine trees.

Geography

References

Unincorporated communities in LaPorte County, Indiana
Unincorporated communities in Indiana